
Dino is a 1972 studio album by Dean Martin arranged by Larry Muhoberac and produced by Jimmy Bowen.

The album peaked at 117 on the Billboard 200, and was the last of Martin's albums to chart. It was reissued on CD by Hip-O Records in 2009.

Reception

The initial Billboard review from 22 January 1972 singled out Martin's cover of Kris Kristofferson's "Kiss the World Goodbye", writing that "The impact hits you on the second or third hearing". William Ruhlmann on Allmusic.com gave the album two and a half stars out of five. Ruhlmann said that "Martin fans who enjoyed his latter-day country sound may have been pleased but, as the generic album title suggested, Dino was a minor effort".

Track listing 
 "What's Yesterday" (Peter Andreoli, Tony Bruno) - 3:17
 "The Small Exception of Me" (Tony Hatch, Jackie Trent) - 3:10
 "Just the Other Side of Nowhere" (Kris Kristofferson) - 2:20
 "Blue Memories" (J. A. Balthrop) - 3:01
 "Guess Who" (Jesse Belvin, JoAnne Belvin) - 2:52
 "Party Dolls and Wine" (Joe Barnhill) - 2:52
 "I Don't Know What I'm Doing" (Balthrop) - 3:03
 "I Can Give You What You Want Now" (Carl Belew, Ketti Frings) - 2:15
 "The Right Kind of Woman" (Baker Knight) - 2:29
 "Kiss the World Goodbye" (Kristofferson) - 3:24

Personnel 
 Dean Martin – vocals
 Larry Muhoberac - arranger	
 Jimmy Bowen - record producer

References 

1972 albums
Dean Martin albums
Albums arranged by Larry Muhoberac
Albums produced by Jimmy Bowen
Reprise Records albums